American war in Afghanistan may refer to:
War in Afghanistan (2001–2021)
The American War in Afghanistan: A History an article about this book written by Carter Malkasian.